The ELA 07 is a series of Spanish autogyros, designed and produced by ELA Aviación of Córdoba, Andalusia.  The aircraft are supplied complete and ready to fly.

Design and development
The ELA 07 series features a single main rotor, a two-seats-in-tandem open cockpit with a windshield, tricycle landing gear with wheel pants and a four-cylinder, air-cooled, four-stroke, dual-ignition  Rotax 912S engine in pusher configuration. The turbocharged  Rotax 914 powerplant is optional.

The aircraft fuselage is made from TIG welded, CNC laser-cut stainless steel tubing for corrosion resistance. The cockpit fairing is non-structural carbon fibre and resin. The triple tail is also made from carbon fibre and resin. Equipment fitted includes a pre-rotator, pneumatic pitch trim and mechanical roll trim.

Operational history
By January 2013 two examples had been registered in the United Kingdom with the Civil Aviation Authority.

Variants
ELA 07 Agro
Agricultural aircraft version with the rear seat replaced by a  tank that can be used to apply liquids or solids in ultra-low volumes. The aircraft fits an  spray boom and an enlarged windshield. The Agro can be quickly returned to two-seat configuration by removal of the spraying equipment.
ELA 07 Cougar
Version for recreational touring use, with a single windshield for the front cockpit.
ELA 07S
Version for flight training use, with two windshields, one for each cockpit, plus dual controls.

Specifications (ELA 07 Cougar)

References

External links

07
2000s Spanish sport aircraft
Homebuilt aircraft
Single-engined pusher autogyros